Jean-Claude Sandrier (born 7 August 1945 in Gannat, Allier) is a French politician and former Mayor of Bourges. He is a member of the French Communist Party.

Joining the Communist in the Bourges city council in 1977, Sandrier became mayor of the city in 1989, but was not re-elected in 1995. He was elected member of Parliament for the second constituency of the Cher in the 1997 election, and was re-elected in 2002 and 2007.  He was succeeded in the constituency by Nicolas Sansu, also of the communists. He was a member and  president of the GDR parliamentary group in the 13th Legislature.

References

People from Allier
1945 births
Living people
Politicians of the French Fifth Republic
French Communist Party members
Chevaliers of the Légion d'honneur
Deputies of the 11th National Assembly of the French Fifth Republic
Deputies of the 12th National Assembly of the French Fifth Republic
Deputies of the 13th National Assembly of the French Fifth Republic